The Focke-Wulf Fw 200 Condor, also known as Kurier (English: Courier) to the Allies, is a German all-metal four-engined monoplane originally developed by Focke-Wulf as a long-range airliner. A Japanese request for a long-range maritime patrol aircraft led to military versions that saw service with the Luftwaffe as long-range reconnaissance and anti-shipping/maritime patrol bomber aircraft. The Luftwaffe also made extensive use of the Fw 200 as a transport aircraft.

It achieved success as a commerce raider until mid-1941, by which time it was being harried by long-range RAF Coastal Command aircraft and the Hurricane fighters being flown from CAM ships.

Design and development
The Fw 200 resulted from a proposal by Kurt Tank of Focke-Wulf to Dr. Rudolf Stuessel of Deutsche Lufthansa to develop a landplane to carry passengers across the Atlantic Ocean to the US. At the time, it was an unusual concept because airlines used seaplanes on long over-water routes. To fly long distances economically, the Fw 200 was designed to cruise at an altitude of over  - as high as possible without a pressurized cabin. Existing airliners were designed to cruise at altitudes below . The Fw 200 was briefly the world's most modern airliner, until other high-altitude airliners started operating: the Boeing 307 Stratoliner in 1940 and the Douglas DC-4 in 1942. The designation "Condor" was chosen because, like the condor bird, the Fw 200 had a very long wingspan relative to other planes of its era, to facilitate then high-altitude flight.

Deutsche Lufthansa issued a specification in June 1936 after discussions between Tank, Stüssel and Carl August von Gablenz. The plane was designed by Ludwig Mittelhuber with Wilhelm Bansemir as project director. The first prototype, the Fw 200 V1, made its first flight after just over one year of development on 27 July 1937 with Tank at the controls. Two further prototypes were powered by German  BMW 132G-1 radials.

The Japanese Navy requested a military version of the Fw 200 for search and patrol duties, so Tank designed the Fw 200 V10 with military equipment. This Fw 200 was held in Germany because war had broken out in Europe by that time. This aircraft became the basis for all later military models used by the Luftwaffe.

To adapt it for wartime service, hardpoints were added to the wings for bombs, the fuselage was strengthened and extended to create more space. Fore and aft dorsal gun positions were added, in addition to an extended-length version of the Bola ventral gondola typical of World War II German bomber aircraft; incorporating a central bomb bay (usually used for additional long-range fuel tanks), as well as heavily glazed fore and aft ventral flexible machine gun emplacements at either end. The extra weight introduced by its military equipment meant that some early Fw 200 aircraft broke up on landing, a problem that was never entirely solved. Later models were equipped with Lorenz FuG 200 Hohentwiel low UHF-band ASV radar in the nose. In 1943 a version entered service that could carry the Henschel Hs 293 guided missile, mandating fitment of the associated Funkgerät FuG 203 Kehl radio guidance gear on a Condor to steer them.

Operational history

The Fw 200 was operated by Deutsche Lufthansa, DDL and Lufthansa's Brazilian subsidiary Syndicato Condor. Dai Nippon KK of Japan also ordered Fw 200 airliners. These could not be delivered to Japan once the war began, so they were delivered to Deutsche Lufthansa instead. On 14 April 1945 an Fw 200 flew Lufthansa's last scheduled service before the end of World War II, from Barcelona to Berlin. Other airlines continued to operate the Fw 200 after the end of World War II.

The first prototype, the Fw 200 V1, upgraded with extra fuel tanks and redesignated Fw 200 S-1, made several record flights. The return trip on 13 August 1938 took 19 hours and 47 minutes. These flights are commemorated with a plaque in Böttcherstraße, a street in Bremen. Beginning on 28 November 1938 it flew from Berlin to Tokyo via Basra, Karachi and Hanoi.

The German Foreign Minister, Joachim von Ribbentrop, used a specially outfitted Condor "Grenzmark", on his two flights to Moscow in 1939, during which he negotiated and signed the "Treaty of Non-Aggression between Germany and the Soviet Union", better known as the Molotov–Ribbentrop Pact. His aircraft bore the German civil registration of D-ACVH.

A Danish-owned Fw 200 aircraft named Dania was seized by the British at Shoreham Airport after Denmark was invaded by German forces in 1940. It was subsequently operated by the British Overseas Airways Corporation (BOAC) and was then pressed into service with the Royal Air Force. It was damaged beyond repair in 1941.

The Luftwaffe initially used the aircraft to support the Kriegsmarine, making great loops out across the North Sea and, following the fall of France, the Atlantic Ocean. The aircraft was used for maritime patrols and reconnaissance, searching for Allied convoys and warships that could be reported for targeting by U-boats. The Fw 200 could also carry a  bomb load or naval mines to use against shipping, and it was claimed that from June 1940 to February 1941, they sank 331,122 tonnes (365,000 tons) of shipping despite a rather crude bombsight. The attacks were carried out at extremely low altitude in order to "bracket" the target ship with three bombs; this almost guaranteed a hit. Winston Churchill called the Fw 200 the "Scourge of the Atlantic" during the Battle of the Atlantic due to its contribution to the heavy Allied shipping losses.

Following the debut of what would become the Luftwaffe's primary seaborne maritime patrol aircraft, the rival trimotored BV 138C flying boat in March 1941; from mid-1941, Condor crews were instructed to stop attacking shipping and avoid all combat in order to preserve numbers. In August, the first Fw 200 was shot down by a CAM ship-launched Hawker Hurricane, and the arrival of the U.S.-built Grumman Martlet, operating from the Royal Navy's new escort carriers, posed a serious threat. The six Martlets operated by the Royal Navy from the first escort carrier  shot down a total of seven Condors while escorting three convoys during her short career in the final months of 1941. On 14 August 1942, an Fw 200C-3 was the first German aircraft to be destroyed by USAAF pilots, after it was attacked by a Curtiss P-40C Warhawk and a Lockheed P-38F Lightning over Iceland.

The Fw 200 was also used as a transport aircraft, notably flying supplies into Stalingrad in 1942. After late-1943, the Fw 200 came to be used solely for transport. For reconnaissance, it was replaced by the Junkers Ju 290, and even some examples of the Heinkel He 177 Greif bombers serving with Kampfgeschwader 40. With the Allied advance into France, maritime reconnaissance by the Luftwaffe became impossible as the Atlantic coast bases were captured. Production ended in 1944 with a total of 276 aircraft produced.

Several damaged Fw 200s landed in Spain during the war. In the beginning, they were repaired and returned to their bases in France. After Operation Torch (the Allied invasion of French North Africa), the Spanish government interned four aircraft that arrived (although their crews were still allowed to return to Germany). Since the aircraft could not be used, they were sold by Germany to Spain. One of the three flyable aircraft was then operated by the Spanish Air Force and the others used for spares. Because of damage and lack of spares, and for political reasons, they were grounded and scrapped around 1950.

Some Condors also crashed in Portugal. Their crews were allowed to return to Germany while the British authorities were allowed to inspect the aircraft and accompanying documentation. Some crew members died in these crashes and were buried in the civilian cemetery of Moura in Alentejo Province, Portugal. The aircraft that crashed in Spain and Portugal had been based in Bordeaux-Merignac, France since 1940. Before then, the operational base of the Fw 200 squadrons had been in Denmark.

Hitler's personal transport

At the suggestion of his personal pilot Hans Baur, Adolf Hitler specified a modified and unarmed prototype Condor, the Fw 200 V3, as his personal transport, as a replacement for his Junkers Ju 52. Originally configured as a 26-passenger Lufthansa transport (Works No. 3099), it was reconfigured as a plush two-cabin airliner. Hitler's armchair-style seat in the cabin was equipped with a wooden table, seat-back armour plating, and a parachute in the seat cushion, with an escape hatch in the floor. In line with Hitler's aircraft preferences, it carried the markings "D-2600" and was named "Immelmann III" in honour of World War I flying ace Max Immelmann. As the war progressed it changed designation to "WL+2600" and finally "26+00"; it was destroyed at Berlin Tempelhof Airport in an Allied bombing raid on 18 July 1944. FW 200s of various types were configured as VIP transports, for the use of Hitler and his staff, and also other aircraft assigned to Heinrich Himmler, Albert Speer, Hermann Göring, and Karl Dönitz.

Allied tactics used against the Condor 
RAF pilot Captain Eric Melrose "Winkle" Brown's plane was attacked and seriously damaged by a Condor in 1940, and he narrowly survived. After this, he studied the design of the Condor seriously for some time. He managed to work out that the forward firing machine gun positions, could swivel, but could only fire in a certain arc otherwise they would hit the fuselage of their own plane. Brown worked out where the arc was, and realised this was a blind spot, if you attacked the front of the plane. He used this to successfully destroy a Condor, then informed his fellow RAF squadron pilots who used the tactic to destroy even more of them.

Variants

There were three variants of the aircraft: the Fw 200A, B, and C. The Model A was a purely civilian variant used by Deutsche Lufthansa, DDL in Denmark, and Syndicato Condor in Brazil. The Fw 200B and Fw 200C models were used as long-range bombers, reconnaissance, troop and transport aircraft.

Fw 200 V1
First prototype. Converted to a Fw 200 S-1 in 1938.
Fw 200 V10
Military prototype developed for Japan, but held in Germany due to the start of WWII. Served as the basis for the C-series.
Fw 200 A-0
Pre-production batch of fourth to ninth prototypes.
Fw 200 B-1
Transportation aircraft fitted with four BMW 132Dc engines; one built.
Fw 200 B-2
Transportation aircraft fitted with four BMW 132H engines; three built.
Fw 200 C-0
Pre-production batch of 10 aircraft, structural strengthening, the first four were manufactured as unarmed transports, the remaining six were fitted with armament.
Fw 200 C-1
First military production version, BMW 132H engines, fitted with full-length Bola ventral gondola which added a narrow bomb bay to the airframe, increased defensive armament, provisions for four 250 kg (550 lb) bombs.
Fw 200 C-2
Similar to C-1, but featured a recessed underside to the rear sheet metal of each of the two outboard engine nacelles which reduced drag, where a hardpoint for a 250 kg (550 lb) bomb or a 300 L (80 US gal) capacity, standard Luftwaffe drop tank was placed.
Fw 200 C-3
Structurally strengthened, fitted with Bramo 323 R-2 radial engines.
Fw 200 C-3/Umrüst-Bausatz 1(/U1)
Featured an increased defensive armament, a 15 mm MG 151 cannon in an enlarged powered forward dorsal turret similar to those used for the BV 138's bow turret position, the 20 mm MG FF replaced by a MG 151/20 cannon.
Fw 200 C-3/U2
Fitted with original, "hemispherical" dorsal turret, and had the 20 mm MG 151/20 at the front end of the ventral Bola gondola replaced with a 13 mm (0.5 in) MG 131 machine gun, which allowed space for the installation of a Lotfe 7D bombsight.
Fw 200 C-3/U3
Fitted with two additional 13 mm MG 131s.
Fw 200 C-3/U4 Fernaufklarer
Had 7.92 mm (0.31 in) MG 15 machine gun replaced by 13 mm MG 131s and carried an extra gunner.
Fw 200 C-4
Similar to C-3, but carried FuG Rostock search radar, late production aircraft used FuG 200 Hohentwiel low-UHF band ASV sea search radar.
Fw 200 C-4/U1 (Werk-Nr 137)
High-speed transport aircraft, only one example built with shortened Bola gondola without bomb bay. Used to transport Adolf Hitler, Heinrich Himmler and Karl Dönitz. Bore the Stammkennzeichen alphabetic code of GC + AE. Captured by British and used as transport by them while based at Airfield B.164 Schleswig, flown frequently by Eric Brown - later to RAE Farnborough with Air Min number 94
Fw 200 C-4/U2 (Werk-Nr 138)
High-speed transport aircraft with similarly shortened Bola gondola (with no bomb bay) to earlier C-4/Umrüst-Bausatz 1 version, with accommodation for 14 passengers, only one example built.
Fw 200 C-6
Several aircraft were outfitted with an early version of the FuG 203 Kehl series missile control transmitter, to carry Henschel Hs 293 missiles and re-designated C-6.
Fw 200 C-8
Fitted with Lorenz FuG 200 Hohentwiel low-UHF band ASV sea-search radar as with some C-4 examples; some examples equipped with FuG 203b Kehl III missile control transmitter and fitted with capability to deploy Henschel Hs 293 MCLOS guidance, rocket-boosted anti-ship missiles from the pair of outer-engine nacelle hardpoints.
Fw 200 S-1
Special designation for Fw 200 V1 that was flown from Berlin to Tokyo.
MK-200
Two Fw 200C-4 re-engined with ASh-62IR engines, operated 1947 to 1950.

Operators

Civil operators
 Brazil
Cruzeiro do Sul
Syndicato Condor - Serviços Aéreos Condor
 Denmark
Det Danske Luftfartselskab

Deutsche Lufthansa
 United Kingdom
BOAC

Military operators

Luftwaffe

Soviet Air Force (post-war captured)
 Spain
Spanish Air Force (Interned)
 United Kingdom
Royal Air Force (one aircraft interned)

Accidents and incidents
 On 6 December 1938, a Deutsche Lufthansa Fw 200S-1 (D-ACON, Brandenburg) ditched in Cavite Bay, Philippines following a loss of engine power due to a broken fuel line; all six on board survived, but the aircraft was written off. The aircraft was on a Berlin–Basra–Karachi–Hanoi–Tokyo publicity flight.
 On 22 April 1940, Luftwaffe Fw 200S-10 "CB+FB" of I/KG 40 (former Deutsche Lufthansa D-ABOD Kurmark) crashed during the invasion of Norway.
 On 20 July 1940, two Deutsche Luftwaffe Fw 200C KG 40 were lost-one (F8-EH) shot down over Sunderland (Crew 3 lost/2 POW); the other lost off Northern Ireland to cause unknown (Crew 2 Killed/3 POW)
 On 20 August 1940, Luftwaffe Fw 200C-1 "F8+KH" of I/KG 40 crashed at Faha Ridge, Cloghane, Ireland; all six on board survived and were interned in Ireland.
 On 22 October 1940, Luftwaffe Fw 200C-1 "F8+OK" of I/KG 40 went missing over the Irish Sea. Possibly unknown bomber which sank the Irish Vessel "Kerry Head" in the Atlantic Ocean off Cape Clear Island, County Cork, Ireland;: reportedly the bomber was brought down in explosion; no survivors from either ship or plane.

 On 15 June 1941, Luftwaffe Fw 200A-0 "F8+CU" (former Lufthansa D-ADHR) burned out at Aalborg Airport following an engine fire.
 On 23 July 1941, a Deutsche Luftwaffe Fw 200C of KG 40 was lost in the Atlantic Ocean west of Ireland, after being shot down by a Lockheed Hudson Mark V of No. 233 Squadron RAF.
 On 22 October 1942, Luftwaffe Fw 200C-4/U3 "F8+EK" of 1.(F)/120 and I./KG 40 was shot down by two USAAF P-38 Lightning fighters and crashed at Kleppatagl, Iceland, killing all seven on board.
 On 9 July 1943, a Luftwaffe Fw 200 of III/KG 40 was shot down by a British fighter and struck a cliff near Aljezur, Portugal, killing all seven on board.
 On 18 July 1944, Adolf Hitler's personal Fw 200 V3 [26+00] was destroyed in bombing
 On 27 September 1944, a Deutsche Lufthansa Fw 200D-2 (D-AMHL) en route to Spain was shot down by an RAF Bristol Beaufighter night-fighter of  No. 415 Squadron and crashed at Saint-Nicolas-lès-Cîteaux, France, killing all nine on board.
 On 29 November 1944, a Deutsche Lufthansa Fw 200A-0/S-5 (D-ARHW, Friesland) en route from Berlin to Stockholm, was accidentally shot down by a German patrol boat and crashed off Måkläppen, Sweden, killing all ten on board.
 On 11 October 1944, Luftwaffe Fw 200C-4 (radio code F8+ES, Werknummer 0163) of 8./KG 40 crashed at Kvanntoneset, Norway due to tail separation while flying over Lavanger fjord, killing all 21 on board.
 On 21 April 1945, a Deutsche Lufthansa Fw 200KB-1 (D-ASHH, Hessen) crashed near Piesenkofen, Germany, killing all 21 on board.
 On 4 September 1946, a Danish Air Lines (DDL) Fw 200A-5 (OY-DEM, Jutlandia) crashed at Northolt Airport after landing in crosswinds; there were no casualties, but the aircraft was written off.
 On 13 December 1946, a Polyarnaya Aviatsiya ('Polar Aviation', a division of Aeroflot) Fw 200C-3 (СССР-N400) force-landed off Ostrov Litne due to engine problems; all 21 on board survived, but the aircraft was written off.
 On 8 March 1947, a Cruzeiro do Sul Fw 200A-0 (PP-CBI, Abaitara) was struck by a Panair do Brazil Douglas DC-3 (PP-PCK) that was landing at Santos-Dumont Airport, there were no casualties, but the Fw 200 was written off.
 On 23 April 1950, a Polyarnaya Aviatsiya MK-200 (СССР-N500) overran the runway and crashed at Yakutsk Airport due to crosswinds; all nine on board survived, the aircraft was written off.

Surviving aircraft
Only one complete reconstructed Fw 200 exists today, an aircraft that ditched in February 1942 and sank to a depth of 60 m (197 ft). This aircraft was raised from Trondheim Fjord in Norway on 26 May 1999. Although the airframe disintegrated while being lowered onto a recovery platform, the remains were transported to Airbus Bremen and spent 22 years being rebuilt. A request from the Berlin museum for a set of separate wings to be recovered from the Kvitanosi mountain near Voss in Norway to complete the rebuilding was at first denied, because the local population wanted the wings to be left in situ as a war memorial. A compromise was reached in 2008, where parts not needed for the restoration would be left on the mountain. In 2009, parts were moved down by helicopter and made ready for transport to Bremen. Other wrecks were also found, but in extremely poor conditions, one at 68 m deep. The aircraft was finished in June 2021, then dismantled and transported to the former Berlin Tempelhof Airport for final assembly as an exhibit in Hangar 7.

Specifications (Fw 200 C-3/U4)

See also

Notes

References

Notes

Bibliography

 .
 Brown, Eric. Wings On My Sleeve: The World's Greatest Test Pilot tells his Story. London: Orion Books. 2006, .
 .
 .
 .
 Poolman, Kenneth. Focke-Wulf Condor: Scourge of the Atlantic. London: MacDonald and Jane's, 1978. .
 .

External links

 Fw 200 C-3 operating instructions
 YouTube German footage of Fw 200 A 'Grenzmark'
 German newsreel of a Fw 200 attck on shipping
 Information on the wreck at Kvitanosi in Norway
 Focke-Wulf Fw 200 images
 Crash Site Mount Brandon Eire 1996
 Description of World War II Fw 200 Crash
 October 2021-released YouTube video (in German) of the sole surviving Fw 200 under restoration

Fw 200
1930s German airliners
1930s German patrol aircraft
World War II patrol aircraft of Germany
Four-engined tractor aircraft
Low-wing aircraft
Aircraft first flown in 1937
Four-engined piston aircraft